Park Sang-hoon (or  ; born 13 March 1993) is a South Korean cyclist, who rides for UCI Continental team .

Major results

Road
Source: 

2010
 1st  Time trial, Asian Junior Road Championships
2011
 Asian Junior Road Championships
1st  Road race
3rd  Time trial
2014
 Asian Under-23 Road Championships
2nd  Time trial
6th Road race
2015
 1st  Time trial, Asian Under-23 Road Championships
 National Road Championships
1st  Under-23 time trial
2nd Time trial
2017
 2nd Time trial, National Road Championships
2018
 3rd Time trial, National Road Championships
2019
 1st Stage 2 Tour of Thailand
 2nd  Team time trial, Asian Road Championships

Track

2010
 1st  Team pursuit, Asian Junior Track Championships
2011
 Asian Junior Track Championships
2nd  Team pursuit
3rd  Points race
2014
 2nd  Team pursuit, Asian Games
2015
 Asian Track Championships
1st  Individual pursuit
3rd  Team pursuit
2017
 Asian Track Championships
1st  Individual pursuit
1st  Madison (with Im Jae-yeon)
2nd  Team pursuit
 3rd  Omnium, 2016–17 UCI Track Cycling World Cup, Los Angeles
2018
 Asian Games
1st  Individual pursuit
2nd  Madison (with Kim Ok-cheol)
2019
 1st  Points race, Asian Track Championships (January)
 Asian Track Championships (October)
1st  Individual pursuit
2nd  Team pursuit
2020
 1st  Madison, National Track Championships (with Cha Dong-heon)
2022
 Asian Track Championships
2nd  Individual pursuit
2nd  Madison (with Min Kyeong-ho)
2nd  Team pursuit

References

External links

1993 births
Living people
South Korean male cyclists
Cyclists at the 2016 Summer Olympics
Olympic cyclists of South Korea
Cyclists at the 2014 Asian Games
Cyclists at the 2018 Asian Games
Asian Games medalists in cycling
Asian Games gold medalists for South Korea
Asian Games silver medalists for South Korea
Medalists at the 2014 Asian Games
Medalists at the 2018 Asian Games
People from Cheonan
Sportspeople from South Chungcheong Province